Giovanni Battista Casanova (2 November 1730 – 8 December 1795) was an Italian painter and printmaker of the Neoclassic period.

He was a brother of Giacomo Casanova and Francesco Giuseppe Casanova and was born at Venice. He studied painting under Israel Silvestre and Dietrich at Dresden, and went in 1752 to Rome, where, under the tuition of Anton Raphael Mengs, he became an accomplished artist in pencil and crayon. Among other works he designed the plates to Winckelmann's Monumenti antichi. He was appointed professor in the Academy at Dresden in 1764.

References

1730 births
1795 deaths
Republic of Venice artists
Italian printmakers
Italian engravers
Academic staff of the Dresden Academy of Fine Arts